Paine is a surname. The Oxford Dictionary of Family Names in Britain and Ireland records it as a variant of Payne, along with Pain, Payn, Pane, Payen, Payan, Panes, and Pagan. The name Payne is believed to derive from the medieval English personal name Pagan.

Notable people with the surname include:

Albert Paine (1861–1937), American author and biographer
Allie Paine (1919–2008), American college basketball player
Augustus G. Paine, Sr. (1839–1915), American financier
Augustus G. Paine, Jr. (1866–1947), American paper manufacturer and bank official
Charles Jackson Paine (1833–1916), American Civil War general and America's Cup yachtsman
Eleazer A. Paine (1815–1882), American Civil War general
Elijah Paine (1757–1842), U.S. Senator from Vermont
Ephraim Paine (1730–1785), Continental Congressman from New York
George Paine (disambiguation), several people
Godfrey Paine (1871–1932), Royal Navy and Royal Air Force officer
Halbert E. Paine (1826–1905), American Civil War general
Harriet Evans Paine (1822–1917), Texas storyteller and oral historian
James Paine (disambiguation), multiple people
John Paine (disambiguation), multiple people
Lyman Paine (1901–1978), American architect
Lynn S. Paine, American economist 
Mary Wheaton Paine (born 1936), American actress
Michael Paine (born 1928), acquaintance of purported assassin Lee Harvey Oswald
Robert Treat Paine (1731–1814), signer of the U.S. Declaration of Independence or any of several Americans by this name
Roxy Paine (born 1966), American artist
Ruth Paine (born 1932), American woman who inadvertently played a role in the Kennedy Assassination
Sumner Paine (1868–1904), American Olympic marksman
Terry Paine (born 1939), English footballer
Thomas Paine (disambiguation), several people
Thomas Paine (1739–1809), U.S. Founding Father and author of Common Sense, Rights of Man and The Age of Reason
Tim Paine (born 1984), Australian cricketer
William Paine (disambiguation), several people

See also
Pain (surname)
Payne (surname)

References